Hong Kong Express is a fully cellular container ship of the Hamburg Express Class owned and operated by the German shipping company Hapag Lloyd Container Linie.

Hull and engine
Hong Kong Express was completed in March 2013 by Hyundai Heavy Industries in their shipyard in Ulsan South Korea under yard number 2244. The vessel, which is operated by German shipping company Hapag Lloyd Container Linie has a capacity of 13,092 TEU and 800 reefer plugs for carrying of refrigerated containers. Her deadweight is 127,170 DWT, gross tonnage is 142,295 GT and net tonnage is 60,481 NT.

The engine turns a single screw or one propeller which is of a tunnel thruster design with rudder-fin. Hong Kong Express has a service speed of 24.6 kts, while the maximum speed exceeds 25.5 kts.

Accidents 
On September 29, 2015 the container ship Hong Kong Express collided with general cargo ship BBS Sky in the North Sea 10 nautical miles off the Netherlands. The accident happened during overtaking, when both ships were running in same direction. There were slight scratches at the ship's hull, but Hong Kong Express resumed her voyage from Rotterdam to Hamburg.

References

External links 
 Hong Kong Express at Hapag-Lloyd
 Hong Kong Express collision in North Sea

2012 ships
Hong Kong Express
Ships built by Hyundai Heavy Industries Group